Rhäzüns railway station is a station in Rhäzüns, Switzerland. It is located on the  gauge Landquart–Thusis line of the Rhaetian Railway.

Services
The following services stop at Rhäzüns:

 Chur S-Bahn:
 : hourly service to Schiers.
 : hourly service between Thusis and Chur.

References

External links
 
 
 

Railway stations in Graubünden
Rhaetian Railway stations
Rhäzüns
Railway stations in Switzerland opened in 1896